Barcis (Western ) is a comune (municipality) in the Province of Pordenone in the Italian region Friuli-Venezia Giulia, located in the Valcellina about  northwest of Trieste and about  north of Pordenone.

References

External links
Official website

Cities and towns in Friuli-Venezia Giulia